Lake Echo, which is almost round, has a surface area of . Lake Echo is inside the city of Lake Alfred, Florida. The north and east shores and part of the south shore are bordered by residences. The west and southwest shores are bordered by citrus groves. The southeast shore is bordered by a wooded area.

Lake Echo has public access at two places. One is on the northwest side of the lake, at the end of South Winona Avenue. Here is the Lake Echo Boat Ramp, which consists of a public boat ramp and public fishing dock/boat dock. On the south side of the lake, at the end of South Nekoma Avenue, is the Echo Terrace Dock. This consists of a public fishing dock and picnic table. The lake has no public swimming beach. Also, a canal on the southeast shore goes to nearby Lake Rochelle. This canal, however, is not always full of water and cannot be navigated by any boats. Technically, since Lake Echo is connected by a canal to Lake Rochelle, it is part of the northern system of the Winter Haven Chain of Lakes. There is no information on Lake Echo about the types of fish in the lake.

References

Echo